Finlay Lewis J. Cole is an English actor from Kingston, London. He is known for his role in the BBC series Peaky Blinders as Michael Gray. He is currently starring as Joshua "J" Cody in TNT's Animal Kingdom, and played young Jakob Toretto in the film F9.

Career 
As a child, Cole wanted to work on boats like his father. His older brother Joe is also an actor and helped Finn get the audition for his first acting job. In 2015, Finn appeared as Eric Birling in Helen Edmundson's BBC One adaptation of An Inspector Calls.

Personal life 
Cole was born in London, the second-youngest of five brothers. One of his elder brothers is Joe Cole, whom he starred alongside in Peaky Blinders.

Filmography

References

External links
 

Living people
Year of birth missing (living people)
Male actors from London
People from Kingston upon Thames